Reginald Robinson II (born April 14, 1997) is an American football cornerback who is a free agent. He played college football at the University of Tulsa.

Early years
Robinson attended Cleburne High School, where he started three seasons on defense at safety and two years at wide receiver on offense. As a senior, he posted 45 tackles, 2 interceptions, 3 passes defensed, 17 receptions for 269 yards, 4 touchdowns and also returned 11 kickoffs for 309 yards (28.1-yard avg.). He earned All-district and All-Johnson County honors during his junior and senior seasons. He also practiced track, running a record 10.68 seconds in the 100 metres.

A 3-star recruit, he committed to the University of Tulsa on January 31, 2015, choosing the Golden Hurricane over offers from Minnesota, Kansas State, Houston and North Texas.

College career
As a redshirt freshman, he appeared in all 13 games with 7 starts. He tallied 37 tackles (30 solo), 7 passes defensed, one forced fumble, one fumble recovery and one blocked field goal.

As a sophomore, he started 11 out of 12 games, registering 38 tackles (32 solo), 2.5 tackles for loss and led the team with 9 passes defensed. He had a career-high 8 tackles against the University of Toledo. He made 5 tackles, one pass defensed and one blocked extra point against the United States Naval Academy.

As a junior, he appeared in 8 games with 4 starts, while missing 4 contests with an injury. He collected 19 tackles and 5 passes defensed. He made 3 tackles and blocked an extra point attempt, which he returned 97 yards for a defensive 2-point conversion, against the United States Naval Academy.

As a senior, he recorded 38 tackles, (one for loss), 4 interceptions (led the team), 13 passes defensed, 2 fumble recoveries and was named first-team All-AAC. He was also a core special teams player, blocking a kick each season he saw the field in Tulsa. After his senior season, he participated in the 2020 Senior Bowl and the 2020 NFL Combine.

Statistics

Professional career

Dallas Cowboys
Robinson was selected by the Dallas Cowboys in the fourth round (123rd overall) of the 2020 NFL Draft. As a rookie, he was moved to safety during training camp, but struggled adapting to the professional game. He was declared inactive for the first 11 games and played in the last five contests only on special teams.

On August 17, 2021, Robinson was placed on season-ending injured reserve with a toe injury.

On March 11, 2022, Robinson was waived by the Cowboys.

Houston Texans
On March 14, 2022, Robinson was claimed off waivers by the Houston Texans. On May 16, 2022, Robinson was waived by the Texans.

Cleveland Browns
On May 17, 2022, Robinson was claimed off waivers by the Cleveland Browns. He was waived with an injury designation on August 5, 2022, and subsequently reverted to injured reserve. He was waived off injured reserve on August 11, 2022.

Seattle Sea Dragons
Robinson was selected by the XFL Seattle Sea Dragons in the Group 2 fifth round (20th overall) of the 2023 XFL Draft.

NFL career statistics

Personal life
Robinson is deaf in his left ear. His father played college football for Grambling State.

References

External links
Tulsa bio

1997 births
Living people
Sportspeople from Ruston, Louisiana
Players of American football from Louisiana
American football cornerbacks
Tulsa Golden Hurricane football players
Dallas Cowboys players
Houston Texans players
Cleveland Browns players
Seattle Sea Dragons players